This is the discography of electronic dance music producers and DJs Pegboard Nerds.

Albums and extended plays

As featured artists

Singles

Covers 
 Snap! – Rhythm Is A Dancer

Remixes

Music videos

References 

Electronic music discographies